The Maldives Third-Way Democrats is a Maldivian political party founded in December 2018.

Maldives Third-Way Democrats (MTD), a political party officially registered in the Maldives. MTD attained formal registration at the Elections Commission (Registrar of Political Parties) on 27 December 2018.

MTD is a healthy mix of young politicians and more familiar veteran leaders in local politics. The first signatory to the party was the former Vice President of Maldives, Ahmed Adeeb Abdul Gafoor, who wrote the charter of the party in jail in isolation. MTD presented its formal membership documentation to the Elections Commission with 3,333 members, who had joined the new party in a matter of weeks.

References

External links 
Maldives Third Way Democrats on Twitter

Political parties in the Maldives
Political parties established in 2018
Neoliberal parties